Nicholas Alexander may refer to:

Nicholas Alexander, 7th Earl of Caledon (born 1955), son of Denis Alexander, 6th Earl of Caledon
Nicholas Alexander of Wallachia (died 1364), Prince of Wallachia 1352–1364
Nicholas Alexander (ski jumper) (born 1988), American competitive ski jumper
Nicholas Alexander, a character from The West Wing seasons 5 and 6

See also

Nick Alexander (disambiguation)